Holah is a surname. Notable people with the surname include:

Eric Holah (born 1937), English footballer
Marty Holah (born 1976), New Zealand rugby union player